The A32 motorway is a motorway in the Netherlands connecting Meppel, via Heerenveen to Leeuwarden. No part of the motorway is subject to a European route.

Route description
Two aqueducts are located on the motorway's route: the Leppa-Akwadukt near Akkrum and the Akwadukt mid-Fryslân near Grou.
Traffic jams occur in rush hour near Interchange Lankhorst, especially in the morning rush hour.

History
A reconstruction of interchange Lankhorst is completed in 2009. The traffic jams to the interchange were solved by extra lanes southbound on the A28.

Exit list

See also
List of motorways in the Netherlands
List of E-roads in the Netherlands

References

External links

Motorways in the Netherlands
Motorways in Drenthe
Motorways in Friesland
Motorways in Overijssel
Transport in Leeuwarden
Heerenveen
Meppel
Staphorst
Steenwijkerland
Weststellingwerf